Argyrolacia is a genus of moth in the family Gelechiidae. It contains only one species, Argyrolacia bifida, which is found in North America, where it has been recorded from California.

The wingspan is 11–12.5 mm. The forewings are white, irrorated with dark fuscous, darker towards the costa and shading lighter towards the dorsum. The hindwings are light grey.

The larvae possibly feed on Ceanothus divaricatus .

References

Litini
Monotypic moth genera
Moths described in 1936
Moths of North America